Clash of Futures is a documentary drama series by Jan Peter and Gunnar Dedio. The series is the continuation of 14 - Diaries of the Great War (2014) and tells the personal stories of thirteen people from all over Europe during the interwar period. The series was part of the eponymous project Clash of Futures. In addition to the series, the project included a theatrical and a radio piece, a book, various Europe-wide special exhibitions and a social media campaign. In the anniversary year of the end of the First World War, the eight-part series first aired September 11, 2018 on Arte.

Plot 
Clash of Futures depicts the history of Europe between the end of the First World War in 1918 and the German invasion of Poland in September 1939. The multilingual, documentary drama series condenses history into the subjective experience of individuals. It focuses on the fate of thirteen people from nine nations. The protagonists include the Communist Hans Beimler, the silent film star Pola Negri, the later Auschwitz commander Rudolf Höß and the French anarchist May Picqueray. In addition, there is a continuation of the story of the Russian child soldier Marina Yurlova and the war reporter Charles Edward Montague from 14 - Diaries of the Great War (2014).

Production 
The source for the scripts were the protagonists' diaries, letters and memoirs. The series was co-produced by LOOKSfilm (Germany), IRIS Group (Luxembourg) and Les Films d'Ici (France), with Fortis Imaginatio (Germany) and in association with Wajda Studio (Poland). The shooting took place in Luxembourg, France, Belgium and Germany.

Episodes

Awards and nominations 
2019
 Nominated for the Grimme-Preis in the category "Information & Culture"
 Award of the French film composer association UMCF (Union des compositeurs de musiques de films) for Laurent Eyquem in the category: "Best Music for a Documentary"
 Civis - Europe's Media Prize for Integration (Europas Medienpreis für Integration) in the category "Entertainment (fictional)"
 Nominated for the German-French Journalist Award 2019 (Deutsch-Französischen Journalistenpreis)
 Nominated for the DAFF Award of the German Academy for Television (Deutsche Akademie für Fernsehen) in the categories "Screenplay" and "VFX / Animation"

References

External links 
 
 

German-language television shows
French-language television shows
English-language television shows
Documentary television series about World War I
2010s documentary television series
2018 German television series debuts